Joe Manhertz is the current director of athletics for St. Bonaventure University. He previously served as associate athletic director at Duke University from 2010 to 2021, and in various administrative roles at the Ohio State University, Hamilton College, Syracuse University, and Colgate University. Manhertz grew up in Fairport, New York, and attended college at Colgate University, where he played college football and college basketball on the school's football and basketball teams. Manhertz was named athletic director at St. Bonaventure University on August 19, 2021.

References

External links
 
St. Bonaventure Bonnies bio
Duke Blue Devils bio

Living people
African-American college athletic directors in the United States
St. Bonaventure Bonnies athletic directors
Colgate Raiders football players
Colgate Raiders men's basketball players
Colgate University alumni
Ohio State University alumni
Year of birth missing (living people)